Norm Macdonald Has a Show was an American Netflix talk show hosted by Norm Macdonald that premiered on September 14, 2018. It was produced by Macdonald, Lori Jo Hoekstra, K.P. Anderson and Daniel Kellison. Macdonald and Hoekstra were also its showrunners.

Production
On March 9, 2018, Netflix announced it had ordered a ten-episode season of a show hosted by Norm Macdonald and accompanied by sidekick Adam Eget. Macdonald and Lori Jo Hoekstra were its showrunners and executive producers, alongside K.P. Anderson and Daniel Kellison. Macdonald's production company, Anchor Spud Productions, produced the show in association with Pygmy Wolf Productions and Lionsgate Television. David Letterman jokingly referred to himself as a location scout for the show's press release, but was a creative partner and helped sell the show to Netflix and is credited as "Special Counsel". It premiered on September 14, 2018.

The cast closed each episode by singing the same song Wayne and Shuster used to close their CBC program in the 1970s.

Episodes

References

External links
 
 

English-language Netflix original programming
2010s American comedy television series
2018 American television series debuts
2018 American television series endings
Television series by Lionsgate Television
Norm Macdonald